Ernest Francis "Kodak" O'Ferrall (16 November 1881 – 22 March 1925) was a popular Australian poet and short story writer born in East Melbourne.

He contributed numerous articles, stories and poems to The Bulletin from 1901 and The Lone Hand, often under the pseudonym "Kodak". He commenced writing as a young single man, working in a bicycle shop then for the International Harvester Company, and living in a series of boarding-houses, which formed the basis of many of his stories.

His stories were mostly ridiculous comic observations of working-class city life, though he could write tenderly and observantly, especially on Irish subjects. Unlike contemporaries such as Henry Lawson, he seldom wrote of bush life or of romance. His most famous story is The Lobster and the Lioness of a drunken boarding-house lodger who mistakes a runaway lioness for a large shaggy dog.

An admirer of his writing was Nettie Palmer, who arranged for The Melbourne Pioneer Players, with which she was associated, to stage a play he wrote.

His most famous poem was Chunda Loo of A Kim Foo, illustrated by Norman Lindsay and used in advertisements for "Cobra" boot polish. The title is most likely the source of the common Australianism "chunder" as rhyming slang for "spew".

One of his sisters was short story writer Laura Palmer-Archer.

Bibliography
short stories:
Bodger and the Boarders illustrated by Percy Lindsay, NSW Bookstall Company 1921
Stories by Kodak illustrated by David Low, Endeavour Press, Sydney 1933
verse:
Odd Jobs illustrated by Albert Collins, Art in Australia, Sydney 1928

Sources
The Oxford Companion to Australian Literature William H Wilde, Joy Hooton and Barry Andrews Oxford University Press 2nd ed. 1994.

References

1881 births
1925 deaths
Australian male short story writers
20th-century Australian poets
Australian male poets
20th-century Australian short story writers
20th-century Australian male writers